Trace Creek is a stream in Bollinger County in the U.S. state of Missouri. It is a tributary of the Castor River.

Trace Creek most likely was named for an Native-American path along its course.

See also
List of rivers of Missouri

References

Rivers of Bollinger County, Missouri
Rivers of Missouri